The Adventures of Thin Lizzy is a compilation album by the rock band Thin Lizzy, released in the United Kingdom and Ireland in 1981. It features songs released as singles from 1972 to 1980.

Track listing
All tracks written by Phil Lynott unless stated.

Side one
"Whiskey in the Jar" (Trad. arr. Lynott, Eric Bell, Brian Downey) - 3:40
"Wild One" - 3:29
"Jailbreak" - 4:01
"The Boys Are Back in Town" - 4:27
"Don't Believe a Word" - 2:18
"Dancing in the Moonlight (It's Caught Me in Its Spotlight)" - 3:26

Side two
"Waiting for an Alibi" - 3:28
"Do Anything You Want To" - 3:50
"Sarah" (Lynott, Moore) - 3:21
"Chinatown" (Downey, Scott Gorham, Lynott, Snowy White) - 3:37
"Killer on the Loose" - 3:54

Personnel
Thin Lizzy
Phil Lynott – bass guitar, vocals, acoustic guitar on track 2, arrangements
Brian Downey – drums, percussion
Eric Bell – guitar on track 1
Scott Gorham – guitar, except tracks 1 and 9
Brian Robertson – guitar on tracks 2–5
Gary Moore – guitar on tracks 7–9
Snowy White – guitar on tracks 10 and 11

Production
Gordon Fordyce - engineer
Kit Woolven - engineer, arrangements

Charts

References

1981 compilation albums
Thin Lizzy compilation albums
Vertigo Records compilation albums